Dayfree Press was an online webcomic syndicate.  Each Dayfree member had a special advertisement banner on their webpage that advertised the comics of another member-site.  The ad was generated at random every time the page reloaded and sometimes showed an ad for the comics that were on the same webpage.  

The name "Dayfree Press" was brainstormed in 1994 by Dana Darko and RStevens, as an umbrella for publishing minicomics for local distribution and mailorder.  Shortly after RStevens left Dayfree to co-found dumbrella.com,  Darko scoured the Internet for "the most promising new webcomics talents."  In 2003, the second incarnation of Dayfree Press began at dayfreepress.com with a starting line-up of eleven established webcartoonists.

Original member comics
 Butternutsquash by Ramon Perez and Rob Coughler
 Coffee Brain by Rob Laughter
 Comet 7 by David Tekiela
 Ctrl+Alt+Del by Tim Buckley
 Instant Classic by Brian Carroll
 Orneryboy by Michael Lalonde
 Robot Stories by Dana Darko
 Sam and Fuzzy by Sam Logan
 Theater Hopper by Tom Brazelton (moved to Boxcar Comics)
 White Ninja by Kent Earle and Scott Bevan

Previous member comics (non-original)
 A Lesson Is Learned But The Damage Is Irreversible by David Hellman and Dale Berran
 Boy on a Stick and Slither by Steven L. Cloud (moved to Dumbrella)
 No 4th Wall to Break by Chris Whetstone and Jamie McGarry
 Nothing Nice To Say by Mitch Clem (moved to Boxcar Comics)
 VG Cats by Scott Ramsoomair

Final membership
 Able and Baker by Jim Burgess
 Bad News Radio by Maxx Diamond
 Butternutsquash by Ramon Perez and Rob Coughler
 Comet 7 by David Tekiela
 Dinosaur Comics by Ryan North
 Girly by Jackie Lesnick
 Kristy Versus the Zombie Army by David Tekelia
 Little Gamers by Pontus Madsen and Christian Fundin.
 Patches by Kelly Vivanco
 Questionable Content by Jeph Jacques
 Sam and Fuzzy by Sam Logan
 Stuff Sucks by Liz Greenfield
 The Adventures of Dr. McNinja by Chris Hastings and Kent Archer
 White Ninja by Kent Earle and Scott Bevan

External links
Dayfree Press